Ahmad Faizal bin Mohammad Tahir (born 26 October 1978) is a Malaysian singer-songwriter who shot to fame after becoming the first runner-up of the first season of One in a Million in 2006. He has won multiple Anugerah Industri Muzik awards (Malaysian equivalent to Grammy Awards), Anugerah Juara Lagu and Anugerah Planet Muzik awards. Now, he runs a production studio named Faithful Music which is home to young and rising artists such as Hanie Soraya Aziz Harun, Harris Baba, Nastia Band, Aizat Amdan, Caliph Buskers and Hannah Delisha. He also runs a charity movement named IAMFAITHMEN whose objective is to support and spread positivity by giving back to the unfortunate.

Personal life

Faizal Tahir is the second child of seven. One of his brothers, Anas Tahir, is a member of nasyid group, Firdaus, after leaving another nasyid group, Far East.

He studied at UiTM Shah Alam, from 2000 to 2003, and graduated with a diploma in Communication & Media Studies.

He is a former member of nasyid group, Mirwana. He is a singer and a composer. He built a mini studio named Home Suite Studio, located at Ukay Perdana, Ampang.

One in a Million

Throughout the competition, Faizal sang:
 Chariot – Gavin DeGraw (Top 20)
 I Don't Wanna Be – Gavin DeGraw (Top 12)
 With A Little Help From My Friends – Joe Cocker (Top 10)
 Are You Gonna Be My Girl – Jet (Top 9)
 L.O.V.E.- Ashlee Simpson (Top 8)
 Warisan Wanita Terakhir – Teacher's Pet (Top 7)
 Elevation – U2 (Top 6)
 Superstition – Stevie Wonder (Top 6)
 Kenangan Terindah – Samsons (Top 3)
 Mahakarya Cinta – Original composition (Grand Finale)
 Medley of We Will Rock You, L.O.V.E. and I Don't Wanna Be – Queen, Ashlee Simpson and Gavin DeGraw (Grand Finale)

At the beginning of the grand finale show, Marion Caunter and Awal Ashaari informed Faizal that he was eliminated, but he was given another chance to perform for the grand prize. His first original single, Mahakarya Cinta, a song composed by Audi Mok, made its debut in the Grand Finale of One in a Million. He finished as runner-up to Suki Low.
Faizal released a single, Kasih Tercipta, as part of the soundtrack for the local film Waris Jari Hantu. He was also named as the sole Malaysian spokesperson for DC Superheroes clothing, as he was famously noted for wearing T-shirts with the Superman logo throughout One in a Million. He also recorded "Gemuruh", the theme song for My Starz LG.

Controversy

On 13 January 2008 Faizal created a controversy by removing his shirt to bare his chest and also his belt "live" on television during 8TV's fourth anniversary concert. 8TV's management took action by giving him strict warnings and requiring him to be involved in charity work for six months. In addition, two days after the incident 8TV held a press conference where Faizal apologized to all who were offended by the stunt. As a result, on 19 January, the Malaysian Communications and Multimedia Commission (MCMC) stated that it would ban him from appearing on television for three months, and also bar 8TV from airing live or tape-delayed entertainment programmes throughout the same period, effective 15 January.
Days after the end of the ban, the Mufti of Perlis, Dato' Dr. Asri Zainul Abidin, issued a grievance to TV3 against having Faizal perform at the Konsert Jom Heboh, which was held in the first weekend of May.

Filmography

Film

Television

Discography

Studio albums

Singles

As lead singer

Guest singles

Awards and nominations

Anugerah Industri Muzik Malaysia (AIM)

Anugerah Juara Lagu (AJL)

Anugerah Planet Muzik

Anugerah Bintang Popular Berita Harian (ABPBH)

SHOUT! Awards

MTV Europe Music Awards

References

External links 

 All About Faizal (from One in a Million's official site)
 Recording Label: Monkey Bone
 Artiste Management: The 8 Unit
 Rockensteiners: Official Fan Club Blog & Forum

1978 births
Living people
Malaysian people of Malay descent
Malaysian Muslims
One in a Million (Malaysian TV series) participants
Malay-language singers
Malaysian male film actors
Malaysian male television actors
Moroccan people of Malay descent
Saudi Arabian people of Malay descent